is a Japanese actress who was born on February 16, 1977, in Nara, Japan. Probably her best-known role was as Sadako Yamamura in Rasen, the 1998 sequel to the horror film Ring.

She has also appeared in a handful of other popular Japanese horror films including Uzumaki (2000) which was based on a Junji Ito manga of the same name, and Eko Eko Azaraku: Misa the Dark Angel (1998). In addition, she played a featured role as the character Colonel in Mamoru Oshii's Assault Girls (2009). She also portrayed in Ultraman X as the Underground Woman/Ryoko Mabuse.

She is also familiar in China for her role as Sadako in the sequel to the Hong Kong TV drama series, My Date with a Vampire II.

Personal life 
She was previously married to football player Daisuke Oku, though that marriage ended in divorce. He died in a traffic collision on October 17, 2014.

Filmography

Films
It's a Summer Vacation Everyday (1994)
A Quiet Life (1995)
Eko Eko Azaraku: Misa the Dark Angel (1998)
Rasen (1998) as Sadako Yamamura
Uzumaki (2000)
Aesop's Game (2019)

Television
Eko Eko Azarak (1997)
My Date with a Vampire II (2000) as Sadako
Sand Whale and Me (2017) as KFC

References

External links 
Hinako Saeki's page on Ringworld
Hinako Saeki's page on Snowblood Apple reviews
Hinako Saeki's Official Site (Japanese Only)
 
 
 

1977 births
Living people
Japanese film actresses
Actors from Nara Prefecture
Japanese television actresses
20th-century Japanese actresses